WRXO (1430 AM) is a radio station broadcasting in a Country and Western Oldies format. It is licensed to Roxboro, North Carolina, United States.  The station is owned by Roxboro Broadcasting Company.

External links

RXO
RXO